The Chartered Institute of Logistics and Transport (CILT) is a professional body representing the transport and logistics industries worldwide. It is a membership-based organisation with over 30,000 members in over 30 countries. This international body is also known as CILT International to distinguish it from the national councils, sections and branches.

The principal objective of the CILT is "To promote and encourage the art and science of logistics and transport", which it achieves both through its membership and professional qualifications. It provides extensive opportunities for training and learning opportunities with a range of internationally recognised qualifications and courses. For those who need support and assistance with their continuous professional development, CILT have an International Awards Committee that offer a range of scholarships and awards.

History
The Institute of Transport (IoT) was founded in London on 3 November 1919 and granted a royal charter in 1926 to become the Chartered Institute of Transport (CIT).

In 1999 the Chartered Institute of Transport and the Institute of Logistics (IoL) combined activities to become the Institute of Logistics and Transport (IOLT). In 2004 "chartered" was adopted into the title, which now reads Chartered Institute of Logistics and Transport.

Membership and Chartered membership 
The Institute of Logistics and Transport offers six grades of membership: Associate, Student, Affiliate, Member (MILT), Chartered Member (CMILT) and Chartered Fellow (FCILT).

Chartered Membership is the institute's senior professional grade of membership. Only professional bodies that have been granted the royal charter can award chartered membership, such as: Chemical, Electrical, Civil, and Mechanical Engineers; Certified, Chartered, Public Finance Accountants; and Surveyors. CILT's Chartership is of equivalent standing to these, and applying for it requires demonstrating achievement of educational attainment, professional competence and (CPD) to a panel. A Chartered Member is awarded the post-nominal letters CMILT.

Chartered Members who have attained important positions or have had distinguished careers can be nominated for Fellowship, with the post-nominal letters FCILT.

Teaching and qualifications 
The institute has a programme of teaching and qualifications, which can lead to a diploma or a degree in transport or logistics. In addition, they certify academic degrees from other institutions, such as the Institute for Transport Studies, University of Leeds and The Department of Logistics and Maritime Studies, The Hong Kong Polytechnic University, providing their graduates with exemption from examinations for proceeding to chartered status.

Representation
The Chartered Institute of Logistics and Transport is represented by national councils and branches in the following continents and countries.

Africa
 Egypt
 Ethiopia
 Ghana
 Malawi
 Mauritius
 Morocco
 Nigeria
 South Africa
 Tanzania
 Uganda
 Zambia
 Zimbabwe

Americas
 North America

Australasia
 Australia
 New Zealand

East Asia
 China
 Hong Kong
 Macao
 Taiwan

South Asia
 Bangladesh
 India
 Pakistan
 Sri Lanka

South East Asia
 Indonesia
 Malaysia
 Philippines
 Singapore

Europe & Middle East
 Ireland
 Malta
 Oman
 Poland
 UAE
 Bahrain
 Ukraine
 United Kingdom

See also 

 Chartered Institute of Logistics and Transport in the UK – the National Council for the United Kingdom

References

External links

Business and finance professional associations
Corby
Organisations based in Northamptonshire
Organizations established in 1919
Logistics and Transport
Logistics